Jack Watson (29 August 1927 – 28 May 2013) was  a former Australian rules footballer who played with Richmond in the Victorian Football League (VFL).

Notes

External links 		
		
		
		
		
		
		
		
1927 births		
2013 deaths		
Australian rules footballers from Victoria (Australia)		
Richmond Football Club players